Mayde Creek High School (MCHS) is a public high school located on Groschke Road in unincorporated Harris County, Texas, and is part of the Katy Independent School District. Mayde Creek serves the portions of the city of Houston located in Katy ISD, including Addicks. Mayde Creek also serves many unincorporated communities in Harris County.

The school opened in 1984. When the school opened it had only two grades, eighth and ninth. By the 1986-1987 academic year it held 9th, 10th and 11th graders; the first class of students graduated in 1988.

The school building is divided into two sections, the smaller of which serves as the "Ninth Grade Center". There is a Performing Arts Center and a Natatorium.

Unusual architectural features of the Mayde Creek High School campus include an open floor-plan cafeteria, a wall, and many glass bricks.

History

In 2012 Children at Risk ranked Mayde Creek as the third-best "Urban" (meaning with a low-income student body at or above 50%) comprehensive high school in the Houston area.

Awards and honors
 All 1st Division UIL Marching Contest, 1st Division Award, 2003, 2004, 2005, 2006, 2007, 2008, 2009, 2010, 2011, 2012, 2014, 2015, 2016, 2017, 2018, and 2019.
 3rd (Bronze), 5A UIL State, Lincoln Douglas Debate Contest, 2010.
 Football playoff appearances in 1987, 88, 93, 94, 96, 97, 2007, 2008 and 2019.

Feeder patterns
The following elementary schools feed into Mayde Creek High School:

Mayde Creek Elementary
Schmalz Elementary
Bear Creek Elementary
Rhoads Elementary
Stephens Elementary (partial)
McRoberts Elementary (partial)
Wolfe Elementary (partial)

The following junior high schools feed into Mayde Creek High School:
Mayde Creek Junior High
Cardiff Junior High

Notable alumni

 Arturo Alvarez - professional soccer player
 Raj Bhavsar - olympic gymnast
 Celeste Bonnin - former wrestler
 Aaron Brown (running back) - professional football player
 Josh Gardner -  professional soccer player
 Matt Montgomery  - singer and musician
 Matt Wenstrom - NBA player

See also

Katy Independent School District
List of schools in Harris County, Texas

References

External links
 
 
 Mayde Creek High School Ram Band
 Rampage Newspaper Online

Educational institutions established in 1984
Public high schools in Harris County, Texas
Katy Independent School District high schools
1984 establishments in Texas